Estonia has recognised same-sex registered partnerships since January 1, 2016. These unions provide same-sex couples with some of the rights, benefits and obligations of marriage.

Registered partnerships

Background
In December 2005, the launch of a new family law bill by the Ministry of Justice, explicitly defining marriage as a union of a man and a woman, initiated a public debate on the issue of recognition of same-sex unions. The Ministry of Social Affairs, led by Minister Jaak Aab, expressed reservations about the draft law. The public debate attracted a significant response from LGBT rights groups, which opposed the family law bill and urged the government not to discriminate between same-sex and opposite-sex couples in marriage, stating that, "We call on the government to drop a clause in the draft law on the family, which does not allow the registration of same-sex marriages or partnerships". On January 4, 2006, five Estonian NGOs supporting LGBT rights issued a press release calling for a new partnership law to give same-sex couples equal rights with opposite-sex couples. On the other hand, a number of conservative politicians claimed that Estonia was "not yet ready" for same-sex marriage, and that there was no need to create a separate law on same-sex unions since existing laws already implied the protection of some of these unions, despite not mentioning same-sex unions explicitly. Väino Linde, the chief of the Constitution Commission of the Riigikogu, stated that he was "glad to see the conservative views in the Parliament and in the [Constitution] Commission".

As of 2005, the Social Democratic Party was the only political party to publicly affirm its support for same-sex unions. The Centre Party and the Reform Party said that they would tolerate such a law, whereas various right-wing parties, particularly the Pro Patria and Res Publica Union, stated their opposition to the recognition of same-sex unions.

Registered Partnership Act
In July 2008, the Ministry of Justice, led by Minister Rein Lang, announced that it was drafting a registered partnership law for same-sex couples. The law, initially expected to come into force in 2009, was intended to provide a number of rights for same-sex couples, such as inheritance and shared property ownership. The law had the support of most parties in the Riigikogu. The Ministry of Justice studied proposals for the registration of unmarried couples, including same-sex couples. A comprehensive report was released in July 2009 examining three options: the recognition of unregistered cohabitation; the creation of a partnership registry; and the extension of marriage to same-sex couples. It left the decision over which model to implement to the Riigikogu and other "stakeholders". On July 1, 2010, a new family law was passed, defining marriage as between a man and a woman and declaring unions between members of the same sex "null and void". Prime Minister Andrus Ansip was quoted as saying, "I do not believe that Estonia, Latvia and Lithuania will soon accept same-sex marriage in the eyes of the law".

On May 25, 2011, Chancellor of Justice Indrek Teder requested that the Ministry of Justice introduce a civil partnership law. He ruled that the non-recognition of same-sex relationships was contrary to the Constitution of Estonia. Thereafter, partnership recognition again became an active political discussion in Estonia.

The Reform Party and the Social Democratic Party supported introducing a partnership law, against the opposition of the conservative Pro Patria and Res Publica Union. The Centre Party supported a discussion on the issue. The bill was drafted in August 2012 by the Ministry of Justice, now led by Minister Kristen Michal, and was under consultation until October 1, 2012. In March 2014, a parliamentary group began to examine the draft bill. The legislation, entitled the Registered Partnership Act, was submitted to Parliament on April 17, 2014. On May 22, it was backed by the Rõivas I Government, and on June 19, 2014, Parliament rejected a motion to kill the bill at first reading in a 32–45 vote. The second reading took place on October 8, where a motion to hold a referendum on the bill was defeated in a 35–42 vote and another motion to kill it was defeated in a 33–41 vote. The bill passed its final vote on October 9 in a 40–38 vote. It was signed into law by President Toomas Hendrik Ilves the same day and took effect on January 1, 2016.

Registered partnerships grant same-sex couples some, but not all, of the rights, benefits, obligations and responsibilities of marriage. Partners are required to support each other, are granted similar property rights to married spouses and have the right to adopt their partner's children (i.e. stepchild adoption). Partnerships performed in other countries are recognised as valid in Estonia.

As of 2022, some implementing acts required for the law to enter into force have not yet been passed, requiring the support of a majority of MPs. The conservative Pro Patria and Res Publica Union, which joined the Rõivas II Government after the March 2015 elections, argued that these acts should be passed in Parliament rather than by the cabinet, creating a dispute with the Reform Party and the Social Democrats. On November 25, 2015, Parliament rejected a motion to kill the implementing bill at first reading in a 41–42 vote. On December 10, the chairman of the Legal Affairs Committee announced that the committee would not finish work on the bill and asked Parliament to begin the second reading before December 17, before it adjourned on January 11. This meant that the Registered Partnership Act would take effect without implementing measures, causing a number of legal loopholes and problems. Further readings were scheduled for the end of January 2016. In January 2017, the chairman of the Legal Affairs Committee of Parliament, Jaanus Karilaid, said that the implementing acts for the registered partnership law were unlikely to be adopted in the current term of Parliament, as passing these laws "would only result in new confrontations". At the same time, Karilaid suggested that Parliament did not have the numbers to repeal the underlying partnership law. Prime Minister Jüri Ratas echoed his suggestion, saying that the law would be repealed by neither the current nor the subsequent parliament. In September 2017, President Kersti Kaljulaid criticised the Parliament for failing to pass the implementing acts.

Because the Riigikogu has yet to adopt the implementation acts, same-sex couples in Estonia have been in legal limbo, and have increasingly turned to the courts in order to have their rights recognised. Numerous partnerships have been performed in Estonia, but these unions were initially not entered into the population registry. In August 2016, a same-sex couple filed a complaint with the Tallinn Administrative Court. In February 2017, the court ordered the government to pay monetary damages for failing to adopt the implementing acts. On April 10, 2018, the Supreme Court ruled that the law is in effect and should be enforced, despite the lack of the implementing measures.

In February 2017, the Tallinn Administrative Court ruled that the Ministry of the Interior had to correctly register the stepchild adoption of a same-sex couple. The Ministry announced it would not appeal the decision. In January 2018, the Tartu Circuit Court ruled that a lesbian couple in a registered partnership may adopt. The court overturned a lower court's ruling which had rejected the couple's adoption application.

On January 27, 2023, Minister of the Interior Lauri Läänemets signed a protocol allowing same-sex registered partners to share a common surname.

During the public debate about the bill, a number of public figures came out as gay, including choreographer Jüri Nael, actor Risto Kübar, fashion designer Aldo Järvsoo, and singer Lauri Liiv.

Subsequent developments
In February 2016, several politicians (mostly from the Estonian Free Party) introduced the Same-Sex Partnership Bill to the Riigikogu, aimed at repealing the Registered Partnership Act and creating a separate law for same-sex couples. Andres Herkel, spokesman for the Free Party, justified the need for the bill and criticised the partnership act, arguing it had "brought legal confusion to include same-sex couples and opposite-sex couples in the same law", "The including of the regulation concerning different-sex couples and same-sex couples in one Act is the basis of very many conceptual confusion." The bill was opposed by the Conservative People's Party, the Reform Party and the Social Democrats, and ultimately failed 14–55 in Parliament.

In October 2017, the Riigikogu voted against a bill which sought to repeal the Registered Partnership Act. The repeal bill, supported by the Conservative People's Party and the Pro Patria and Res Publica Union, was rejected by a vote of 19–47 at first reading on October 17. The Social Democrats, the Reform Party and the two independents opposed the bill, arguing it would "take rights away". The Centre Party was split with some voting against the bill and others abstaining, whilst the Free Party mostly abstained. Lawmakers supporting the bill claimed that the Registered Partnership Act had "brought division within Estonian society".

a. Both MPs were formerly members of the Pro Patria and Res Publica Union.

Statistics
29 same-sex partnerships had been performed by August 2016. By October 2017, 59 cohabitation agreements had been concluded.

Immigration and residency rights
In June 2017, the Estonian Supreme Court ruled that same-sex couples have a right to the protection of family life. Clarifying the courts' jurisdiction in the matter of applying legal protection in residence permit disputes, the court ruled that Estonian law does not forbid issuing a residence permit to same-sex spouses.

In November 2017, the Tallinn Circuit Court ruled that an American woman, in a same-sex relationship with an Estonian woman, could not be issued a residence permit. The couple appealed to the Supreme Court, which dismissed their case in April 2018. The couple entered into a registered partnership, as the Supreme Court had ruled that same month that the partnership law was in effect. This enabled the American partner to reside in Estonia. Following a ruling by the European Court of Justice in June 2018 relating to the rights of same-sex couples in the European Union, an Estonian court ruled that same-sex couples must be treated the same way as opposite-sex couples in the issuance of residence permits.

On June 21, 2019, the Supreme Court ruled in two cases that the refusal to grant a residence permit to a foreign same-sex partner of an Estonian citizen was unconstitutional. The court ruled that the provision preventing the granting of temporary residence permits to same-sex partners registered in Estonia was unconstitutional and invalid in respect of the Aliens Act. In accordance with the principles of human dignity and equal treatment guaranteed by the Constitution of Estonia, the Supreme Court found that family law also protects the right of people of the same sex to live in Estonia as a family.

Same-sex marriage
A same-sex marriage was recognised by a court in December 2016. The couple, two men who had originally married in Sweden but now live in Estonia, had their marriage officially registered in late January 2017. Initially, a court in Harju County refused to register their marriage, but the couple appealed the decision. In December, the Tallinn Circuit Court ruled that the marriage must be entered into the Estonian population registry. Much uncertainty followed the ruling, concerning whether the ruling applied universally to all couples or only to this specific case. According to several Estonian jurists and lawyers, whether a same-sex marriage will be recognized must be assessed on a case-by-case basis. Others argue that the Private International Law Act, the law which applies when the validity of foreign marriages needs to be assessed, does not explicitly prohibit the recognition of same-sex marriages. In March 2017, Martin Helme of the Conservative People's Party, speaking in the Riigikogu, threatened the judges who issued the ruling, saying he wanted their "heads to roll". Many criticised his comments, including President Kersti Kaljulaid, Chief Justice Priit Pikamäe and Speaker of Parliament Eiki Nestor.

In November 2017, Archbishop Urmas Viilma of the Estonian Evangelical Lutheran Church argued that the Estonian Constitution should define marriage as between "a man and a woman". This proposal was supported by the 2019 election platforms of both the Conservative People's Party, and Isamaa. Speaker Eiki Nestor rejected the call, saying "that not even the Bible made such a specification, and neither should the Constitution".

In December 2021, the Ministry of the Interior confirmed that transgender people can change their legal gender while remaining married to their spouse. Estonian law permits the Ministry to petition to annul such a marriage under a "public interest" defense. A spokesman for the Ministry said, "during the last five or six years, significant changes have taken place in society, as a result of which it can no longer be said that the marriage of a same-sex couple is contrary to Estonian public order."

Attempt at constitutional ban
Following the 2019 elections, the Centre Party entered into a coalition government with the Conservative People's Party and Isamaa. The People's Party made a referendum on same-sex marriage a condition for joining the government. Eventually, the coalition agreement between the three parties included the pledge of conducting a referendum on same-sex marriage. The referendum would have asked voters whether the Estonian Constitution should define marriage as the "union of a man and a woman". Initially, the referendum was supposed to be binding and directly amend the Constitution if approved by voters; however, after several months of controversy and debate, the government decided that the referendum would be non-binding and would gauge public opinion on the issue. The government agreed to hold the referendum in spring 2021. The referendum proposal was widely criticized by the Reform Party and the Social Democrats. Opponents argued that the measure was "divisive", "confusing", and "unnecessary". In November 2020, Prime Minister Jüri Ratas announced that the wording of the referendum would likely be "Should marriage in Estonia remain as a union between one man and one woman?", and made assurances that the referendum would take place in spring 2021, though an exact date had not yet been agreed on. Further controversy arose when the Election Committee announced it would not be possible to hold the referendum in spring if the government wanted to use a new electronic voter list, in line with recently passed legislation.

In response to the referendum proposal, the extra-parliamentary Estonian Greens launched a petition in October 2020 on the government website rahvaalgatus.ee calling for the legalisation of same-sex marriage. The portal allows citizens to present various petitions, with petitions receiving more than 1,000 signatures referred to the Riigikogu for consideration. The marriage petition by the Greens was signed by 35,805 people by its deadline, becoming the most signed petition in the portal's history and surpassing the previously most signed petition which had received 7,000 signatures. The Social Democratic Party formally announced its support for same-sex marriage on 1 November 2020, becoming the first mainstream political party in Estonia to do so. Estonia 200 also supports same-sex marriage.

A draft bill to hold the marriage referendum on April 18, 2021 passed first reading on December 14, 2020. A motion to kill the bill failed by a vote of 48–51, with the Reform Party, the Social Democrats and some Isamaa MPs opposing the bill. Leader of the Reform Party Kaja Kallas argued that the planned referendum was "pointless, ridiculous and cruel", adding, "Generally, we have nothing against referenda. The opinion of the people can be sought in matters of national importance; however, what is being offered to us now is not an issue of national importance." Kallas argued that the funds needed for the referendum would be better used in matters relating to the COVID-19 pandemic. Before the bill's second reading, the Social Democrats and Reform Party introduced some 9,370 amendments to the proposed bill, with the aim of paralyzing the work of the Parliament and causing the bill to be shelved. Many of the amendments were of a humorous nature, such as "Should men be banned from having hair transplants in the Republic of Estonia?", and "Should friendship be banned in Estonia?". This prompted the Constitutional Affairs Committee chair, Anti Poolamets, to limit MPs' floor time to a few minutes. The bill's second reading was scheduled for January 13, 2021. However, on that same day, Ratas resigned as prime minister after his Centre Party was suspected of "criminal involvement" in an influence peddling scandal, causing the fall of the government. Following the fall of the government, Centre MP Andrei Korobeinik proposed to withdraw the bill. Poolamets nevertheless decided to put it to a vote, and the bill was defeated by a vote of 26–49. On January 26, 2021, Kallas became prime minister and a new government of the Reform and Centre parties was sworn in.

a. Originally a member of the Estonian Centre Party, Raimond Kaljulaid left the party in April 2019 over the decision to include the EKRE into the government coalition. On 7 November 2019, Kaljulaid announced the decision to join the SDE, although by law, he cannot officially join the SDE parliamentary group.

Public opinion
A poll conducted in June 2009 indicated that 32% of Estonians believed same-sex couples should have the same legal rights as opposite-sex couples. Support was 40% among young people, compared to 6% among older people.

A poll conducted in September 2012 found that 34% of Estonians supported same-sex marriage and 46% supported registered partnerships, with 60% and 45% opposed, respectively. The poll found an ethnic divide, with 51% of ethnic Estonians supporting registered partnerships, compared to only 21% of ethnic Russians. A similar poll conducted in 2014 during the parliamentary debate on registered partnerships found that support had dropped significantly, with 29% of respondents supporting same-sex marriage and 40% supporting registered partnerships; opposition had increased to 64% and 54%, respectively.

The 2015 Eurobarometer survey showed that 31% of Estonians supported same-sex marriage, while 58% were opposed.

A poll conducted between March and April 2017 found that, while support for same-sex registered partnership legislation was almost unchanged in three years, support for same-sex marriage had increased to 39%, with 52% opposed (compared to 60% opposed in 2012 and 64% opposed in 2014). It also found that acceptance of homosexuality had increased from 34% in 2012 to 41%, with 52% against. At the same time, support for joint adoption rights remained unchanged, with 66% opposed. Support for registered partnerships was highest among young people and Estonian speakers.

The 2019 Eurobarometer found that 41% of Estonians thought same-sex marriage should be allowed throughout Europe, while 51% were opposed.

A poll conducted following the failed referendum attempt showed that support for same-sex marriage and registered partnerships had increased in Estonia. The survey conducted by the Estonian Human Rights Centre and Turu-uuringute AS in 2021 showed that 64% of Estonians supported same-sex registered partnerships (35% "fully" and 29% "somewhat"), and 47% supported same-sex marriage. Support was highest among Estonian speakers; with support for partnerships rising to 72% and for same-sex marriage to 53%. Support for partnerships fell to 47% among native speakers of other languages (mostly the Russian-speaking minority), and to 35% for same-sex marriage. In addition, 53% of Estonians considered same-sex attraction "acceptable", with 73% of people aged 15–19 agreeing.

See also
LGBT rights in Estonia
Recognition of same-sex unions in Europe

Notes

References

External links
Kooseluseadus, Riigi Teataja (in Estonian)

LGBT rights in Estonia
Estonia